The Port of Toledo is the port authority for Toledo, in the U.S. state of Oregon. The port was founded in 1910 after the passing of a new state law, at a time when many U.S. port authorities were founded.

The port provides commercial moorages, ship repair facilities, and industrial space.

Recreational facilities include recreational moorage, launch facilities, and a non-motorized paddle park and launch area that is used by kayakers, canoeists and bird watchers. The port sponsors an annual wooden boat show on the third weekend in August.

The port's only shipyard was shut down in November 2008 after its private owner abandoned the operation. In June 2010, the port was planning to purchase that shipyard, in hopes of capturing the ship maintenance business of the National Oceanic and Atmospheric Administration (NOAA) homeport in Newport, which is downriver from Toledo.

References

External links
The Port of Toledo, Oregon: 1910-2010 by James H. Hitchman
History: Port of Toledo by Elmer R. Price

Toledo, Port of
Toledo, Port of
Oregon Coast
Transportation in Lincoln County, Oregon
1910 establishments in Oregon